Antonio Picagli (21 April 1893 – 12 October 1978) was a Brazilian footballer. He played in two matches for the Brazil national football team from 1917 to 1919. He was also part of Brazil's squad for the 1917 South American Championship.

References

External links
 
 

1893 births
1978 deaths
Brazilian footballers
Brazil international footballers
Place of birth missing
Association football midfielders
Sociedade Esportiva Palmeiras players